Yazd rubber industries complex (Mijitim'-e Sânai'-ye Lâstik-e Yezd), also known as Yazd Tire, is an Iranian tire manufacturer for automobiles, commercial trucks, light trucks, SUVs, race cars, airplanes, and heavy earth-mover machinery. It has been established since 1985.

Operations 
Yazd Tire is a joint-stock company; Artawheel Tire and Social Security Investment Group are the company's largest shareholders.

References

External links 
 

Manufacturing companies established in 1985
Tire manufacturers of Iran
Iranian brands
Iranian companies established in 1985